Dr Alison Morrison-Low is a retired Principal Curator for Science at National Museums Scotland.

Background 
Morrison-Low is a director for the Brisbane Observatory Trust and has been a director for the Northern Lighthouse Heritage Trust, the British Society For The History Of Science and the Museum of Scottish Lighthouses.

In July 2016 she was an invited expert on for "The Invention of Photography", In Our Time, BBC Radio 4. She won the Saltire Society Research Book Prize in 2005 for "Weights and Measures in Scotland: A European Perspective", and in 2008 the Hans R. Jenemann Foundation's Paul Bunge Prize in 2008 for "Making Scientific Instruments in the Industrial Revolution".

In 2018 Morrison-Low became the first female president of the Royal Scottish Society of the Arts.

Selected publications

References

External links 
 http://blog.nms.ac.uk/author/dralisonmorrison-low/ Articles on the NMS blog by Morrison-Low.

Scottish women academics
Scottish women scientists
Living people
Year of birth missing (living people)